HD 34626, also known as MZ Aurigae, is an unusual variable star in the northern constellation of Auriga.  It has an apparent magnitude of 8.2 and is about 3,300 light years away.

The spectrum of HD 34626 had long been known to be unusual, with very broad lines indicating rapid rotation and emission lines marking it as a Be star.  In 1970, it was found to vary in brightness by 0.1 magnitude over time scales of 8 to 12 hours, but these variations are not periodic. This indicates the variability is not caused by ellipsoidal effects, and the nature of the variability remains unknown.  It may be a type of SX Arietis variable.

HD 34626 has exhausted its core hydrogen and evolved away from the main sequence.  Its spectral type indicates that it is a subgiant, but evolutionary models suggest it may be in the giant stage.

References

External links
 HIC 24938
 Image MZ Aurigae

Auriga (constellation)
034626
024938
Aurigae, MZ
B-type subgiants
Be stars
Durchmusterung objects